The position of Oregon Poet Laureate has existed since 1923.  The incumbent is Anis Mojgani.

Oregon Poets Laureate are appointed by the Governor of Oregon.  Since 2006, the Poet Laureate program is administered by the Oregon Cultural Trust.

List of Oregon Poets Laureate

Edwin Markham (1923–1931)
Ben Hur Lampman (1951–1954)
Ethel Romig Fuller (1957–1965)
William Stafford (1975–1990)
Lawson Fusao Inada (2006–2010)
Paulann Petersen (2010–2014)
Peter Sears (2014–2016)
Elizabeth Woody (2016–2018)
Kim Stafford (2018–2020)
Anis Mojgani (2020–present)

References

External links

Oregon culture
 
1923 establishments in Oregon